Lieutenant General William Whitmore (14 May 1714 – 22 July 1771) was a British Army officer and Member of Parliament (MP).

He was the son of William Whitmore, MP of Lower Slaughter, Gloucestershire.

He joined the Army, reaching the rank of Lieutenant-General in 1760. in 1755 he was ordered to raise a new regiment, originally to be called the 55th Foot, but subsequently named the 53rd Foot. After the regiment was formed he was given its colonelcy, prior to the regiment sailing to Gibraltar for garrison duties. In 1758 he was transferred as colonel to the 9th Regiment of Foot, a commission he held until his death.

He was Member of Parliament for Bridgnorth from 1741 to 1747 and from 1754 to 1771. He was made Warden of the Mint from 1766 to his death in 1771.

He died unmarried, but left a son and 2 daughters.

References
 J. B. Lawson, WHITMORE, William (1714–71), of Lower Slaughter, Glos. in The History of Parliament: the House of Commons 1715–1754 (1970).
 Sir Lewis Namier, WHITMORE, William (1714–71), of Lower Slaughter, Glos. in The History of Parliament: the House of Commons 1754–1790 (1964).

1714 births
1771 deaths
British Army lieutenant generals
Scots Guards officers
Royal Norfolk Regiment officers
Queen's Royal Regiment officers
King's Shropshire Light Infantry officers
Members of the Parliament of Great Britain for English constituencies
British MPs 1741–1747
British MPs 1754–1761
British MPs 1761–1768
British MPs 1768–1774